The 1991 World Junior Ice Hockey Championships (1991 WJHC) was the 15th edition of the Ice Hockey World Junior Championship and was held in various communities in Saskatchewan, Canada.  Canada won its second consecutive gold medal, and fifth overall, while the Soviet Union won silver, and Czechoslovakia the bronze.

Final standings
The 1991 tournament was a round-robin format, with the top three teams winning gold, silver and bronze medals respectively.

Norway was relegated to Pool B for 1992.

Results

Scoring leaders

Tournament awards

Pool B
Eight teams contested the second tier in Tychy and Oswiecim Poland from December 27 to January 5. It was played in a simple round robin format, each team playing seven games.

Standings

Germany was promoted to Pool A and Denmark was relegated to Pool C for 1992.

Pool C
Eight teams contested the third tier in Belgrade Yugoslavia from December 27 to January 5.  It was played in a simple round robin format, each team playing seven games.   Greece's national junior team made their debut this year.

Standings

North Korea was promoted to Pool B for 1992.

References
 
1991 World Junior Hockey Championships at TSN
 Results at Passionhockey.com

World Junior Ice Hockey Championships
World Junior Ice Hockey Championships
Sports competitions in Saskatoon
Ice hockey competitions in Saskatchewan
International ice hockey competitions hosted by Canada
1990–91 in Canadian ice hockey
December 1990 sports events in Canada
January 1991 sports events in Canada
1991 in Saskatchewan
1990 in Saskatchewan
Sport in Moose Jaw
Humboldt, Saskatchewan
Kindersley
North Battleford
Sport in Oświęcim
Sport in Tychy
1990–91 in Polish ice hockey
International ice hockey competitions hosted by Poland
1990–91 in Yugoslav ice hockey
1990s in Belgrade
International sports competitions in Belgrade
1990 in Serbian sport
1991 in Serbian sport
International ice hockey competitions hosted by Yugoslavia